This is a list of singles that charted in the top ten of the Billboard Hot 100, an all-genre singles chart, in 2021.

Top-ten singles

Key
 – indicates single's top 10 entry was also its Hot 100 debut
 – indicates Best performing song of the year
(#) – 2021 Year-end top 10 single position and rank

2020 peaks

2022 peaks

Holiday season

Notes 
A remix of Ariana Grande's "34+35" that features Doja Cat and Megan Thee Stallion helped to bring the song back into the top ten, to its peak position of number 2, on January 30, 2021, and all three artists were credited on the song that week. As of the February 6, 2021 chart, Grande returned to being the only artist credited.
Ariana Grande is credited on a remix of The Weeknd's "Save Your Tears", with her name appearing on the song beginning with the Hot 100 chart dated May 8, 2021. Prior to that week, The Weeknd was the sole artist credit.
In August 2021, with Dua Lipa's "Levitating" having already been in the top ten for more than 30 weeks, DaBaby was no longer listed as a featured artist on the song. His name is being retained on the entry as he was credited for a majority of the song's run in the top ten, including the week it peaked at number two.

The single re-entered the top ten on the week ending January 9, 2021.
The single re-entered the top ten on the week ending January 30, 2021.
The single re-entered the top ten on the week ending March 13, 2021.
The single re-entered the top ten on the week ending March 27, 2021.
The single re-entered the top ten on the week ending April 3, 2021.
The single re-entered the top ten on the week ending June 5, 2021.
The single re-entered the top ten on the week ending June 12, 2021.
The single re-entered the top ten on the week ending June 26, 2021.
The single re-entered the top ten on the week ending August 14, 2021.
The single re-entered the top ten on the week ending September 4, 2021.
The single re-entered the top ten on the week ending September 25, 2021.
The single re-entered the top ten on the week ending October 2, 2021.
The single re-entered the top ten on the week ending October 9, 2021.
The single re-entered the top ten on the week ending December 11, 2021.
The single re-entered the top ten on the week ending December 18, 2021.
The single re-entered the top ten on the week ending December 25, 2021.

See also 
 2021 in American music
 List of Billboard Hot 100 number ones of 2021

References

External links
Billboard.com
Billboard.biz
The Billboard Hot 100

United States Hot 100 Top Ten Singles
2021